Henry Dreyfuss Brant (September 15, 1913 – April 26, 2008) was a Canadian-born American composer. An expert orchestrator with a flair for experimentation, many of Brant's works featured spatialization techniques.

Biography 

Brant was born in Montreal, to American parents (his father was a violinist), in 1913. Something of a child prodigy, he began composing at the age of eight, and studied first at the McGill Conservatorium (1926–29) and then in New York City (1929–34). He played violin, flute, tin whistle, piano, organ, and percussion at a professional level and was fluent with the playing techniques for all of the standard orchestral instruments.

As a 19-year-old, Brant was the youngest composer included in Henry Cowell's landmark book from 1933, American Composers on American Music; and Cowell realized that Brant had already demonstrated an early identification with the American experimental musical tradition. He was represented in Cowell's anthology by an essay on oblique harmony, an idea which presaged some of the techniques used in his mature spatial compositions.

Thereafter Brant composed, orchestrated, and conducted for radio, film, ballet, and jazz groups. The stylistic diversity of these early professional experiences would also eventually contribute to the manner of his mature output. Starting in the late 1940s, he taught at Columbia University, the Juilliard School and, for 24 years, Bennington College.

During the mid-1950s Brant came to the conclusion that (as he himself put it) "single-style music … could no longer evoke the new stresses, layered insanities, and multi-directional assaults of contemporary life on the spirit." In pursuit of an optimal framework for the presentation of a music which embraced such a simultaneity of musical textures and styles, Brant made a series of experiments and compositions exploring the potential for the physical position of sounds in space to be used as an essential compositional element.

As well as producing works for the concert hall, Brant worked as an orchestrator for many Hollywood productions, including the Elizabeth Taylor movie Cleopatra (1963), one of many collaborations with composer Alex North. Brant helped with the orchestration of North's score for 2001, and due to North's stress-induced muscle spasms, Brant had to conduct the recording session for the film score. Other composers whom he assisted as orchestrator included Virgil Thomson, Aaron Copland, George Antheil, Douglas Moore, and Gordon Parks. Brant's work as an orchestrator was not limited to film and stage: his long-term affinity for the music of Charles Ives — whose The Unanswered Question was an acknowledged inspiration for Brant's spatial music — was ultimately found in the premiere of Brant's arrangement of Ives' Second Piano Sonata, "Concord, Mass 1840–60" as A Concord Symphony in 1996. A Concord Symphony was recorded by the San Francisco Symphony on its SFS Media label.

From 1981, Brant made his home in Santa Barbara, California. There he died on April 26, 2008, at the age of 94.

Music

Beginning with the 1953 score Rural Antiphonies (predating Stockhausen's Gruppen of 1955–57 but coming thirty-five years after Charles Ives's Fourth Symphony of 1912–18 and Rued Langgaard's Music of the Spheres of 1916–18), Brant developed the concept of spatial music, in which the location of instruments and/or voices in physical space is a significant compositional element. He identified the origins of the concept in the antiphonal music of the late renaissance and early baroque, in the antiphonal use of four brass ensembles placed in the corners of the stage in the Requiem of Hector Berlioz and, most importantly, in works of Charles Ives, in particular The Unanswered Question. Henry Brant was America's foremost composer of acoustic spatial music. The planned positioning of performers throughout the hall, as well as on stage, was an essential factor in his composing scheme and a point of departure for a radically expanded range and intensity of musical expression. Brant's mastery of spatial composing technique enabled him to write textures of unprecedented polyphonic and/or polystylistic complexity while providing maximum resonance in the hall and increased clarity of musical detail for the listener. His catalogue comprises over 100 spatial works.
 
In keeping with Brant's belief that music can be as complex and contradictory as everyday life, his larger works often employ multiple, contrasting performing forces, as in Meteor Farm (1982) for symphony orchestra, large jazz band, two choruses, West African drum ensemble and chorus, South Indian soloists, large Javanese Gamelan ensemble, percussion orchestra and two Western solo sopranos. Brant's spatial experiments convinced him that space exerts specific influences on harmony, polyphony, texture and timbre. He regarded space as music's "fourth dimension," (after pitch, time and timbre). Brant experimented with new combinations of acoustic timbres, even creating entire works for instrumental family groups of a single timbre: Orbits for 80 trombones, organ and sopranino voice, Ghosts & Gargoyles for 9 flutes, and others for multiple trumpets and guitars. This predilection for ensembles of a single tone quality dates from Angels and Devils (1932) for an ensemble of 11 flutes. His experimentation was not always successful however. His 1972 piece Immortal Combat staged outside Lincoln Center was drowned out by traffic noise and a thunderstorm. With the exception of pieces composed for recorded media (in which he used over-dubbing or acoustical sound sources), Brant did not use electronic materials or permit amplification in his music.

He is perhaps best known for his compositions Verticals Ascending (conceptually based on the architecture of the Watts Towers in Los Angeles) and Horizontals Extending. A "spatial opera", The Grand Universal Circus (Libretto: Patricia Gorman Brant) was premiered in 1956. Brant won the Pulitzer Prize for Music in 2002 for his composition Ice Field. In addition to composing, he played the violin, flute, tin whistle, percussion, piano, and organ and frequently included soloistic parts in his large works for himself to play.

Later premieres included Wind, Water, Clouds & Fire, for 4 choirs and instrumentalists, commissioned by Present Music and premiered on November 19, 2004 at The Cathedral of St. John the Evangelist, Milwaukee, Wisconsin. Tremors, for 4 singers and 16 instrumentalists, commissioned by the Getty Research Institute, premiered on June 4, 2004, at the Getty Center in Los Angeles. Tremors was repeated in a Green Umbrella concert at LA's Walt Disney Concert Hall on November 1, 2004. Ghosts & Gargoyles, a concerto for flute solo with flute orchestra, for New Music Concerts, Toronto had its premiere on May 26, 2002. Ice Field, for large orchestral groups and organ, was commissioned by Other Minds for a December 2001 premiere by the San Francisco Symphony.

Brant's handbook for orchestration, Textures and Timbres, was published posthumously.

Orchestra/chamber orchestra
An Adventure
Ballad (The Half Songs)
Decision
Dedication in Memory of a Great Man
Downtown Suite
Symphony in B-flat (The Nineteen-Thirties)
Symphony No. 2 (Promised Land)
Variations on a Canadian Theme
Whoopee in D (1972)
Whoopee in D major: (Overture for a Fine Orchestra)

Solo instrument with orchestra/chamber orchestra
Concerto for Clarinet and Orchestra
Concerto for Saxophone and Orchestra
Fantasy and Caprice, for violin and orchestra
Concerto for Alto Sax and Orchestra (1941)
Concerto for Alto Saxophone Solo Or Trumpet Solo (1996)

String orchestra
Saraband
Two Choral Preludes
Two Lyric Interludes

Band/wind ensemble
Millennium I
Signs and Alarms
Street Music (Three Places in Montreal)
Whoopee in D major

Solo instrument with band/wind ensemble
Concerto for Alto Sax or Trumpet with Nine Instruments
Concerto for Clarinet and Dance (Jazz) Orchestra
Statesmen in Jazz: Three Portraits

Solo instrument with chamber ensemble
Violin Concerto with Lights

Vocal quartet with chamber ensemble
Four Skeleton Pieces
The Scientific Creation of the World

Chamber music

With soloist
Divinity, with solo harpsichord
Feuerwerk, with solo female speaker
Newsflash, with narrator
Piri

Two instruments
Ballad, for violin and piano
Duo, for cello and piano
Partita, for flute and piano
Two Rush Hours in Manhattan, for violin and piano

Three instruments
Ice Age, for clarinet, glockenspiel, and piano (1954)
Imaginary Ballet, for piccolo, cello, and piano
Music for a Five and Dime
Strength through Joy in Dresden: Introduction and Coda to a Theater Piece

Four instruments
Conversations in an Unknown Tongue
Four Mountains in the Amstel
Fourscore
From Bach's Menagerie
Funeral Music for the Mass Dead
Galaxy I
Handorgan Music (1933 Version)
Handorgan Music (1984 Version)
A Requiem in Summer
Variations on a Theme by Robert Schumann

Five to nine instruments
All Souls Carnival
American Commencement
Aria with Thirty Variations
Galaxy II
Hieroglyphics II
Kitchen Music
The Marx Brothers
A Requiem in Summer
Stresses

Percussion ensemble
Origins (Symphony for Percussion)

A cappella chorus
December Madrigal
Peace Music for U.N. Day
The Three-Way Canon Blues

Two pianos
Four Choral Preludes
Toccata on "Wachet Auf"

Solo instrument
The Big Haul, for cello
Confusion in the Salon, for piano
Country Tunes in Jazz, for piano
Four Traumatics, for piano
Mobiles 1, for flute
Oases, for cello
Two Conclusions, for piano
Two Sarabandes, for keyboard instrument

Spatial works
Orbits: A Spatial Symphonic Ritual (for 80 trombones, organ and sopranino voice) (1979)
Autumn Hurricanes, A Spatial Cantata for Widely Separated Vocal and Instrumental Groups (1986)

Orchestra/chamber orchestra
Antiphony I
Antiphony I (chamber version)
Antiphony One
Curriculum ll: Spatial Tone Poem
Desert Forests (2000)
Ice Field
On the Nature of Things (1956)
Plowshares and Swords
Prisons of the Mind
Trinity of Spheres

Awards
A member of the American Academy of Arts and Letters, Brant was awarded the 2002 Pulitzer Prize in Music for Ice Field (2001), commissioned by Other Minds and premiered by the San Francisco Symphony under the direction of Michael Tilson Thomas. He received two Guggenheim Fellowships and was the first American composer to win the Prix Italia. Among other honors were Ford Foundation, Fromm Foundation, National Endowment for the Arts and Koussevitzky awards and the American Music Center's Letter of Distinction. In conjunction with Brant's 85th birthday concert, Wesleyan University conferred upon him the honorary degree of Doctor of Fine Arts (1998). The Paul Sacher Foundation in Basel acquired Brant's complete archive of original manuscripts, including over 300 works, in 1998.

References

External links
Henry Brant's page at Carl Fischer
Henry Brant's Home Page
Henry Brant Tribute by Samara Rainey, WMJ Issue 3, Article 13
OtherMinds.org: Charles Amirkhanian Interviews Henry Brant
MusicMavericks.PublicRadio.org: An interview with Henry Brant by Alan Baker, Minnesota Public Radio, June 2002
Art of the States: Henry Brant two works by the composer
The Henry Brant Collection on innova
San Francisco Chronicle obituary for Brant
Obituary from the Washington Post

1913 births
2008 deaths
20th-century classical composers
21st-century classical composers
American experimental musicians
American male classical composers
American classical composers
Bennington College faculty
Canadian classical composers
Canadian experimental musicians
Juilliard School faculty
Members of the American Academy of Arts and Letters
Pulitzer Prize for Music winners
Pupils of George Antheil
Pupils of Wallingford Riegger
21st-century American composers
20th-century Canadian composers
20th-century American composers
20th-century American male musicians
21st-century American male musicians
Canadian emigrants to the United States